Brian Richard Mynott (born 29 January 1944) is a former Australian rules footballer. He was born in Southampton in England.

Mynott is a 1966 VFL premiership player for St Kilda.

References

External links

Australian rules footballers from Victoria (Australia)
1944 births
Sportspeople from Southampton
St Kilda Football Club players
St Kilda Football Club Premiership players
VFL/AFL players born in England
Living people
English emigrants to Australia
One-time VFL/AFL Premiership players